Zappa is a 1983 Danish coming-of-age drama film directed by Bille August. It was screened in the Un Certain Regard section at the 1983 Cannes Film Festival and was entered into the 13th Moscow International Film Festival. The film was also selected as the Danish entry for the Best Foreign Language Film at the 56th Academy Awards, but was not accepted as a nominee.

Zappa was adapted for the screen from the novel by the same name by Bjarne Reuter. It is the first of a trilogy, followed by Når snerlen blomstrer and Vi der valgte mælkevejen. The sequel Når snerlen blomstrer was also filmed by Bille August in 1984 and is known as Twist and Shout in English.

Cast
 Adam Tønsberg as Bjørn
 Morten Hoff as Mulle
 Peter Reichhardt as Steen
 Lone Lindorff as Bjørn's mother
 Arne Hansen as Bjørn's father
 Thomas Nielsen as Henning
 Solbjørg Højfeldt as Steen's mother
 Bent Raahauge Jørgensen as Steen's father (as Bent Raahauge)
 Inga Bjerre Bloch as Mulle's mother
 Jens Okking as Mulle's father
 Elga Olga Svendsen as Bjørn's grandmother
 Willy Jacobsen as Bjørn's Grandfather
 Ulrikke Bondo as Kirsten
 Søren Frølund as Teacher 'Kaalormen'
 Michael Shomacker as Asger

Reception
The film was reviewed in The New York Times in 1984, Janet Maslin stating that "Mr. August has made Zappa a suspenseful, moving drama, with concerns that are as troubling as they are universally recognizable." Nathan Rabin reviewed Zappa for the AV Club in 2004, writing that he saw it as a "masterfully bleak coming-of-age drama" and that "the film's unnerving power comes from its realization that everyone is doomed to go through adolescence alone." DVD Talk and AllMovie also reviewed, with the former commenting that it was "a pretty intense piece or work" and superior to its sequel.

In a review for Positif, François Ramasse praised the film's intelligence and its shift from gentleness to violence.

See also
List of Danish submissions for the Academy Award for Best Foreign Language Film
List of submissions to the 56th Academy Awards for Best Foreign Language Film

References

External links
 
 

1983 films
1983 drama films
1980s coming-of-age drama films
1980s Danish-language films
Films directed by Bille August
Danish coming-of-age drama films